Leonhard Merzin (10 February 1934 in Aruküla, Kudina Parish (now Maardla, Mustvee Parish) – 2 January 1990 in Tartu) was an Estonian theatre and film actor, one of the Estonian actors active in the Soviet Union and abroad. He played in more than 50 films. His most notable role in Estonia is "Teacher Laur" in Spring (Kevade) and as Edgar in Soviet Union adaption of King Lear (Korol Lir).

Biography
From 1952 to 1954 Merzin studied at the Tartu Art School and in 1969 he graduated from the Viljandi School of Cultural Education.

Merzin also tried hand as a painter, mostly depicting nature and flowers.

He is buried at the Raadi cemetery in Tartu.

Filmography

References

External links

1934 births
1990 deaths
Estonian male film actors
Estonian male stage actors
Soviet male film actors
People from Mustvee Parish
20th-century Estonian male actors
Burials at Raadi cemetery
Soviet theatre directors
Estonian theatre directors